M. P. Giri is an Indian politician who is a Member of Legislative Assembly of Tamil Nadu. He was elected from Chengam as an Dravida Munnetra Kazhagam candidate in 2016 & 2021.

Elections contested

References 

Tamil Nadu MLAs 2021–2026
Tamil Nadu MLAs 2016–2021
Living people
Dravida Munnetra Kazhagam politicians
Year of birth missing (living people)
Tamil Nadu politicians